The Elizabeth O'Neill Verner House is a pre-Revolutionary house that was built by a Huguenot barrel maker. The house was built in 1718. Later, the house was used as a "sweet shoppe." In the 20th century, American artist Elizabeth O'Neill Verner kept her art studio in the house.

References

Houses in Charleston, South Carolina